The Bangkok Marriott Marquis Queen's Park, formerly known as The Imperial Queen's Park Hotel, Bangkok, is the largest hotel  in Bangkok with his 1,251 rooms. Located on Sukhumvit Road, the hotel stands near the Emporium (Bangkok) complex and the Benchasiri Park.
Its large function rooms of 2,500 sq. m. can seat up to 2000 persons, and professional staff to accommodate any special theme, for conventions and banquets.

The hotel closed on October 2, 2014 for a 3-billion-baht renovation and reopened as the Bangkok Marriott Marquis Queen's Park.

History

The New Imperial Hotel was established in 1972, the very first hotel with 170 rooms, providing guests through its Thai Hospitality.

In July 1978, The Imperial Impala Hotel, with its 197 guest rooms, was opened for service on Sukhumvit 24 Road.

For more than 30 years, the number of staff increased from 100 to almost 2,827. This has enabled The New Imperial Hotel to expand extensively. To date they have a network of 11 hotels in Central Bangkok and prominent provinces.

In 1993, The New Imperial Hotel's official brand name The Imperial Family of Hotels had been transferred to The Imperial Hotels Group.

Restaurants
 Goji Kitchen + Bar
 The Lobby Lounge
 Pagoda Chinese Restaurant
 Siam Tea Room
 Akira Back
 ABar Rooftop

See also
 The Imperial Adamas Beach Resort, Phuket
 The Imperial Boat House Beach Resort, Koh Samui
 The imperial Resort & Sports Club, Chiang Mai
 The imperial golden triangle resort, Chiang Rai
 The Imperial Hua Hin Beach Resort

Photo gallery

References 

Hotels in Bangkok